The Noakhali riots were a series of semi-organized massacres, rapes and abductions, combined with looting and arson of Hindu properties, perpetrated by the Muslim community in the districts of Noakhali in the Chittagong Division of Bengal (now in Bangladesh) in October–November 1946, a year before India's independence from British rule.

It affected the areas under the Ramganj, Begumganj, Raipur, Lakshmipur, Chhagalnaiya and Sandwip police stations in Noakhali district and the areas under the Hajiganj, Faridganj, Chandpur, Laksham and Chauddagram police stations in Tipperah district, a total area of more than 2,000 square miles.

The massacre of the Hindu population started on 10 October, on the day of Kojagari Lakshmi Puja and continued unabated for about a week. It is estimated that 5,000 were killed, hundreds of Hindu women were raped and thousands of Hindu men and women were forcibly converted to Islam. Around 50,000 to 75,000 survivors were sheltered in temporary relief camps in Comilla, Chandpur, Agartala and other places. Around 50,000 Hindus remained marooned in the affected areas under the strict surveillance of the Muslims, where the administration had no say. In some areas, Hindus had to obtain permits from the Muslim leaders in order to travel outside their villages. The forcibly converted Hindus were coerced to give written declarations that they had converted to Islam of their own free will. Sometimes, they were confined in others' houses and only allowed to be in their own house when an official party came for inspection.

Haran Chandra Ghosh Choudhuri, the only Hindu representative to the Bengal Legislative Assembly from the district of Noakhali, described the incidents as "the organized genocide  by the Muslim mob". Syama Prasad Mookerjee, the former Vice-Chancellor of the University of Calcutta and the former Finance Minister of Bengal, dismissed the argument that the Noakhali incidents were ordinary communal riots. He described the events as a planned and concerted attack on the minority community by the majority community.

Mahatma Gandhi camped in Noakhali for four months and toured the district in a mission to restore peace and communal harmony. In the meantime, the Congress leadership started to accept the proposed Partition of India and the peace mission and other relief camps were abandoned. The majority of the survivors migrated to West Bengal, Tripura and Assam.

Cause of Riot
When elections were held in the provinces of India in 1937, the provincial power of Bengal came into the hands of the Muslims. But during the long British rule, Hindus were mainly in the seat of ruler (control of zamindari). They were also ahead in education and economics. Educated and financially advanced Hindus were forced to obey many new laws of the new Muslim government in various ways. One of which is manifested in many places including Noakhali. A section of Muslims was looking for an opportunity to vent their old grievances against Hindu zamindars (Local rulers). And that was the opportunity they got at the end of British rule in India.

Attempts to bar Hindus from entering jobs, poor status of Muslims in Hindu-majority provinces, partition of Bengal, and the preposterously fanatic provocations by the Muslim League led to such a gruesome incident.  The relationship between the Hindus and Muslims was very delicate. After this, the false news of a joint Hindu attack on Muslims in the Hindu-dominated Calcutta in retaliation to the attacks by Muslims on Direct Action Day spread exaggeratedly, adding fuel to the fire of previous accumulated anger. The Hindu-Muslim riots in Noakhali are believed to have been caused mainly by the resentment of Muslims against Hindus when the British rule was ending and the false news of massacre against Muslims in Calcutta and its outrage. Furthermore, there were rumours that, Jaminder of Ramganj Rajendra Lal Chowdhury is going to sacrifice a Muslim boy instead goat in a sacrificial event that gives an initiation of that event. On 11 th October, 1946 riots started.

Prelude 
Communal tensions in Noakhali started soon after the Great Calcutta Riots between Muslims and Hindus. Though it was quiet, the tension had been building up. During the six weeks leading up to the disturbances in Noakhali, Eastern Command headquarters in Kolkata received reports indicating tension in the rural areas of Noakhali and Chittagong districts. Village poets and balladeers composed anti-Hindu poems and rhymes, which they recited and sang in market places and other public gathering places.

Eid al-Fitr violence 
On 29 August, the day of Eid al-Fitr, the tension escalated into violence. A rumour spread that the Hindus had accumulated weapons. A group of Hindu fishermen were attacked with deadly weapons while fishing in the Feni River. One of them was killed and two seriously injured. Another group of nine Hindu fishermen from Charuriah were severely assaulted with deadly weapons. Seven of them were admitted to hospital. Devi Prasanna Guha, the son of a Congressman of Babupur village under the Ramganj police station, was murdered. One of his brothers and a servant were assaulted. The Congress office in front of their house was set on fire. Chandra Kumar Karmakar of Monpura was killed near Jamalpur. Jamini Dey, a hotel worker, was killed near Ghoshbag. Ashu Sen of Devisinghpur was severely beaten up at Tajumiarhat at Char Parvati. Rajkumar Choudhury of Banspara was severely assaulted on his way home.

All the properties of six or seven Hindu families of Kanur Char were looted. At Karpara, a Muslim gang armed with deadly weapons entered the house of Jadav Majumdar and looted properties worth Rs. 1,500. Nakul Majumdar was assaulted. The houses of Prasanna Mohan Chakraborty of Tatarkhil, Nabin Chandra Nath of Miralipur and Radha Charan Nath of Latipur were looted. Five members of the Nath family of Latipur were injured.

The temple of the family deity of Harendra Ghosh of Raipur was desecrated: a calf was butchered and thrown inside the temple. The Shiva temple of Dr. Jadunath Majumdar of Chandipur was desecrated in a similar manner. The household shrines of Nagendra Majumdar and Rajkumar Choudhury of Dadpur were desecrated and the idols were stolen. The Durga images of Ishwar Chandra Pathak of Kethuri, Kedareshwar Chakraborty of Merkachar, Ananta Kumar De of Angrapara and Prasanna Mohan Chakraborty of Tatarkhil were broken.

Communal propaganda 

In 1937, Gholam Sarwar Husseini, the scion of a Muslim Pir family, was elected to the Bengal Legislative Assembly on a Krishak Praja Party ticket. However, in the 1946 elections, he lost to a Muslim League candidate. Gholam Sarwar's father and grandfather were pious Muslims and had led lives of penance. Their family happened to be the hereditary  at the Diara Sharif in Shyampur, revered as a holy place by both Muslims and Hindus. After the Direct Action Day riots in Kolkata, Husseini began to deliver provocative speeches, inciting the Muslim masses to take revenge for the Kolkata riots. In some places, Hindu shops began to be boycotted. In the Ramganj and Begumganj police station areas, the Muslim boatmen refused to ferry Hindu passengers. In the first week of September, Muslims looted the Hindu shops in Sahapur market. Hindus were harassed and molested when they were returning to their native villages from Kolkata to spend the puja holidays. From 2 October onwards there were frequent instances of stray killings, theft and looting.

Events 
According to Governor Burrows, "the immediate occasion for the outbreak of the disturbances was the looting of a Bazar [market] in Ramganj police station following the holding of a mass meeting and a provocative speech by Gholam Sarwar Husseini." That included attacks on the place of business of Surendra Nath Bose and Rajendra Lal Roy Choudhury, the former president of the Noakhali Bar and a prominent Hindu Mahasabha leader.

Violence 
The riots started on 10 October, the day of Kojagari Lakshmi Puja, when the Bengali Hindus were involved in puja activities. Ghulam Sarwar instructed the Muslim masses to march towards the Sahapur market. Another Muslim League leader, Kasem, also arrived at the Sahapur market with his private army, then known as Kasemer Fauz.

After that Kasem's army marched to Narayanpur to the zamindari office of Surendranath Basu. They were joined there by another Muslim mob from Kalyannagar. Some of the Muslim tenants also joined the mob and attacked the zamindari office.

On 11 October, the private army of Gholam Sarwar, known as the Miyar Fauz, attacked the residence of Rajendralal Roychowdhury, the president of the Noakhali Bar Association and the Noakhali District Hindu Mahasabha. At that time Swami Tryambakananda of Bharat Sevashram Sangha was staying at their house as a guest. Roychowdhury fended off the mob from his terrace with his rifle for the entire day. At nightfall, when they retreated, he sent the swami and his family members to safety. The next day the mob attacked again. Rajendralal Roychowdhury's severed head was presented to Golam Sarwar on a platter and his two daughters were given to two of his trusted generals. According to Sucheta Kriplani, Rajendralal Roychowdhury had followed the footsteps of Shivaji and Guru Gobind Singh and became a martyr, defending his faith and family honour. Acharya Kripalani, a staunch believer in non-violence, held that the resistance offered by Rajendralal Roychowdhury and his family was the nearest approach to non-violence. After three months Mahatma Gandhi, while touring Noakhali, visited their gutted house. On 11 January 1947, the corpses of the Roychowdhurys were exhumed from a swamp in Azimpur and brought before Mahatma Gandhi's prayer assembly at Lamchar High School. After the prayers the corpses were cremated according to Hindu rites.

On 12 October, the residence of Chittaranjan Dutta Raychaudhuri, at Shayestaganj, under the Raipur police station, was attacked by a Muslim mob. Kasem's private army attacked the Das family of Gopairbag, near Sompara market, under the Ramganj police station. The Das family were Kasem's immediate neighbour. The Chaudhuri family of Noakhola village under the Ramganj police station were also attacked by a Muslim mob. The attackers resorted to murder, loot and arson. Another Muslim mob attacked the residence of Yashoda Pal and Bharat Bhuiyan at Gobindapur under Ramganj police station. Between Amishapara and Satgharia the residences of the Bhaumiks and the Pals were totally destroyed by fire. In Nandigram, Golam Sarwar's private army burnt the Nag residence, the post office and the school founded by Ramanikanta Nag. The Hindus from the nearby areas had taken shelter in the Nag residence and initially the police protected them, repulsing the first attacks. The attackers then resorted to indiscriminate looting in the village. On 13 October, at 12 noon, a mob of 200 to 250 Muslims armed with deadly weapons attacked the Hindus in Changirgaon. 1,500 maunds of paddy were burnt and all the temples were destroyed. The Hindu women were stripped of their shankha and sindur. The men were forced to perform the namaz.

On 14 October, Jogendra Chandra Das, the M.L.A. from Chandpur, Tipperah, wrote to Jogendra Nath Mandal stating that thousands of Scheduled Caste Hindus had been attacked in Ramganj police station area in Noakhali. Their houses were being looted and set on fire and they were being forcibly converted to Islam.

According to eyewitnesses, the attackers used petrol to set the houses on fire. In the remote island of Sandwip, which had no motor cars, petrol was imported from the mainland to set the houses on fire. According to Rakesh Batabyal, the use of petrol and kerosene indicates the premeditated and organised nature of the attacks. In Sandwip, revolutionary freedom fighter Lalmohan Sen was killed when he tried to resist a Muslim mob from killing the Hindus.

Violence broke out in the Ramganj police station area, in the north of Noakhali District, on 10 October 1946. The violence unleashed was described as "the organized fury of the Muslim mob". It soon engulfed the neighbouring police stations of Raipur, Lakshmipur, Begumganj and Sandip in Noakhali, and Faridganj, Hajiganj, Chandpur, Lakshman and Chudagram in Tippera. As per Gandhian Ashoka Gupta's report during Mahatma Gandhi's visit to the area, at least 2000 Hindus were forced to change their religion to Islam, six were forced to marry by force and one was murdered. However, the official estimate was 200.

Jashoda Ranjan Das, one of the landlord of Noakhali Nauri, was killed during the riot. He succeeded in saving his wife and children, sending them to West Bengal with the help of local Muslims, and stayed with his brothers-in-law. A few months later, with the help of Mahatma Gandhi, the bodies were found.

Forcible conversions 
Village after village was forcibly converted to Islam. The men were forced to wear skullcaps and grow beards. The women were stripped of their shankha and sindur and forced to recite the kalma. Moulavis visited their homes and imparted Islamic teachings.

Ashoka Gupta, whose husband was then a judge serving in Chittagong, was among the first outsiders to reach Noakhali to provide relief.

When the news of the killings and forced conversions appeared in the news for the first time, Star of India, a newspaper patronised by the Muslim League, denied any incidents of forcible conversion. However, Huseyn Shaheed Suhrawardy, while answering a question from Dhirendranath Datta in the assembly, stated that there had been 9,895 cases of forcible conversion in Tipperah. The exact figure was not known for Noakhali, but it ran into thousands. Edward Skinner Simpson stated in his report that 22,550 cases of forcible conversion took place in the three police station areas of Faridganj, Chandpur and Hajiganj in the district of Tipperah. Dr. Taj-ul-Islam Hashmi concluded that the number of Hindu women raped or converted was probably many times the number of Hindus killed. According to M. A. Khan, at least 95% of the Hindus of Noakhali were converted to Islam. According to Justice G. D. Khosla, the entire Hindu population of Noakhali were robbed of all they possessed and then forcibly converted to Islam.

Official developments 
On 13 October, Kamini Kumar Dutta, the leader of the Indian National Congress in the Bengal Legislative Council, paid a visit of inquiry to Noakhali in his personal capacity during which interviewed Abdullah, the District Superintendent of Police. On the 15th, he met the Minister of Civil Supplies of the Government of Bengal, who was on his way to Noakhali. On his return he communicated with the Home Department of the Interim Government seeking effective remedial measures and stating that it was impossible for anyone from outside to enter the disturbed areas without risking his life. He further stated that the authorities were anxious to hush up the entire episode from public inspection. No force had been sent to the disturbed areas until 14 October.

Huseyn Shaheed Suhrawardy, the Prime Minister of Bengal, held a press conference in Kolkata on 16 October at which he acknowledged the forcible conversion, plunder and looting of Hindus in Noakhali. While insisting that the incidents had stopped, he said he had no idea why the incidents had occurred. He stated that it had become difficult for troops to move in because the canals had been jammed, bridges were damaged and roads blocked. He contemplated dropping printed appeals and warnings from the air instead of rushing in troops. On 18 October, Frederick Burrows, the Governor of Bengal, along with Suhrawardy and the Inspector General of Police for Bengal, visited Feni by plane and flew over the affected areas. Later, the Government of Bengal sent an official team to Noakhali and Tipperah to assess the situation. The team consisted of Jogendra Nath Mandal the newly appointed Member-in-Charge of Law in the Interim Government; Shamsuddin Ahmed, the Minister of Labour in the Bengal Government; Abul Hashem, the Secretary of Bengal Provincial Muslim League; Fazlur Rahman; Hamidul Haque Chowdhury; Moazzem Hossain; A. Malik and B. Wahiduzzaman.

On 19 October, Jivatram Bhagwandas Kripalani, the president-elect of the Indian National Congress; Sarat Chandra Bose, the Member-in-Charge of Works, Mines and Power in the Interim Government; Surendra Mohan Ghosh, the President of the Bengal Provincial Congress Committee; Sucheta Kripalani; Major General A. C. Chatterjee; Kumar Debendra Lal Khan and the editor of Anandabazar Patrika flew to Chittagong at the suggestion of Mahatma Gandhi. On the way they had made a brief stop at Comilla, where thousands of Hindu victims reported experiencing atrocities. In Chittagong, they met Frederick Burrows, the Governor of Bengal, who assured them that according to Suhrawardy, the Prime Minister of Bengal, everything was peaceful and orderly. He explained the rape and molestation of Hindu women as natural because they were more attractive than Muslim women.

On 21 October, Arthur Henderson, the Under-Secretary of State for India and Burma, read a report from the Governor of Bengal in the House of Commons that stated that the number of casualties was expected to be in the three-figure range. Sarat Chandra Bose challenged the statement, saying that 400 Hindus had been killed in a single incident at the office and residence of landlord Surendranath Bose.

On 25 October, at a mass meeting in New Delhi presided over by Suresh Chandra Majumdar, the managing director of the Anandabazar Patrika and the Hindusthan Standard, a resolution was passed demanding the immediate recall of the Governor of Bengal, the dismissal of the Muslim League ministry and intervention of the centre. At a press conference in Kolkata on 26 October, Lieutenant General F. R. R. Bucher, the GoC of Eastern Command, stated that it was impossible to estimate how long it would take to restore the confidence of the affected people in the government.

Relief operations 

When the news of the events in Noakhali reached the outside world, Indian social, religious and political institutions came forward for relief and rescue operations. Notable among them were Bharat Sevashram Sangha, Hindu Mahasabha, the Indian National Congress, the Communist Party of India, the Indian National Army, Prabartak Sangha, Abhay Ashram, Arya Samaj and Gita Press. 30 relief organisations and six medical missions performed relief work in Noakhali. In addition there were 20 camps under Gandhi's "one village one worker" plan.

On receiving the news of Noakhali, Ashutosh Lahiry, the General Secretary of Hindu Mahasabha, immediately left for Chandpur. Syama Prasad Mookerjee, Nirmal Chandra Chatterjee and Pandit Narendranath Das, along with other workers, flew to Comilla and entered the affected area with military escorts. A plane was requisitioned and dispatched to the affected area loaded with rice, chira, bread, milk, biscuits, barley and medicines. Other consignments of relief supplies were dispatched by train. The affected people who took refuge in Kolkata were given protection in about 60 centres in the city and suburbs. Syama Prasad Mookerjee appointed M/S. P. K. Mitter & Co., a Kolkata-based accountancy firm, to control the collection, disbursement and audit of funds contributed by the public.

Nirmal Chandra Chatterjee, the acting President of the Bengal Provincial Hindu Mahasabha; Debendranath Mukherjee, the general secretary; and Nagendranath Bose, the Assistant Secretary, proceeded to the affected areas of Noakhali and Tipperah. Chatterjee consulted Larkin, the Relief Commissioner, and considered zonal settlement to be the best method for providing relief and safety, keeping in mind the future resettlement of the victims in their respective villages. Accordingly, relief centres were opened at Bamni under the Raipur police station, Dalalbazar under the Lakshmipur police station and Paikpara under the Faridganj police station. M. L. Biswas, the Secretary of the Bengal Provincial Hindu Mahasabha; P. Bardhan, the Medical Secretary; and J. N. Banerjee, the Treasurer, were sent to the other affected areas to set up relief centres. Each of the relief centres was provided with a mobile medical unit under medical officers. Sanat Kumar Roy Chowdhury, the vice-president of the Bengal Provincial Hindu Mahasabha, inaugurated a well equipped 25-bed hospital at Lakshmipur in the memory of Rajendralal Raychaudhuri. Dr. Subhodh Mitra was placed in charge of the hospital. Nirmal Chandra Chatterjee visited Noakhali for a third time and inaugurated a students' home at Bajapati named 'Shyamaprasad Chhatrabas'.

On 20 October, at a meeting of the Chattogram Mahila Sangha, the Chittagong branch of the All India Women's Conference, presided over by Nellie Sengupta, a resolution was passed that the organisation would work for the relief and recovery of the abducted Hindu women in Noakhali. The Noakhali Relief Committee was formed for the purpose of providing relief and rehabilitation to the affected Hindu women. From 26 October onwards, the committee began to send a group of volunteers led by Ashoka Gupta to Noakhali for relief operations on a weekly basis. Their task was to search for abducted Hindu women, provide relief to the refugees at the railway stations, and prepare a list of affected villages based on the accounts of affected villagers. Leela Roy reached Ramganj on 9 December, walking 90 miles on foot from Chaumohani. She recovered 1,307 abducted girls. Her organisation, the National Services Institute, set up 17 relief camps in Noakhali. In December, the Srihatta Mahila Sangha decided to send Kiranshashi Deb, Leela Dasgupta, Saralabala Deb and Suhasini Das to Noakhali for relief work. The Congress leaders who took the lead in the relief work were Satish Chandra Dasgupta, Dhirendranath Dutta, Trailokya Chakrabarti and Bishwaranjan Sen.

Mahatma Gandhi sent four Hindu girls to Sujata Devi, the daughter-in-law of Chittaranjan Das, for rehabilitation. Sujata Devi established the Bangiya Pallee Sangathan Samity for the rehabilitation and a free school for the education of the girls.

The Government of Bengal appointed a Special Relief Commissioner with magisterial powers for the distribution of funds to the refugees. A Government Order dated 10 February 1947 announced relief of Rs 250 to each affected household for rebuilding and also promised the amount of Rs 200 to each affected weaver, fisherman and peasant for buying a new loom, langal, ox cart or fishing equipment on furnishing proof of loss. The relief workers were surprised at the government decision considering an entire joint family as one single holding or unit and contested that the sum of Rs 250 was greatly inadequate for rebuilding a homestead. Ashoka Gupta met Akhtaruzzaman, the Additional District Magistrate of Noakhali, on 11 February on behalf of the relief workers and obtained an explanation of the government order so that none of the affected families were left out.

Gandhi peace mission 

Gandhi played a role in cooling down the situation. He toured the area with his aides, and was instrumental in calming the communal tension.

On 18 October, Dr. Bidhan Chandra Roy personally communicated with Gandhi, appraising him of the massacre of Hindus in Noakhali and the plight of the Hindu women in particular. At the evening prayer, Gandhi mentioned the events in Noakhali with concern. He said, if one-half of India's humanity was paralyzed, India could never really feel free. He would far rather see India's women trained to wield arms than that they should feel helpless. On 19 October, he decided to visit Noakhali. Before leaving, he was interviewed on 6 November by Dr. Amiya Chakravarty at the Abhay Ashram in Sodepur, near Kolkata. After the interview, Dr Amiya Chakravarty said that the most urgent need of the hour was to rescue the abducted Hindu women who obviously could not be approached by the military because, after being forcefully converted, they were kept under the veil.

Gandhi started for Noakhali on 6 November and reached Chaumuhani the next day. After spending two nights at the residence of Jogendra Majumdar, on 9 November he embarked on his tour of Noakhali, barefoot. In the next seven weeks, he covered 116 miles and visited 47 villages. He set up his base in a half-burnt house in the village of Srirampur, where he stayed until 1 January. He organized prayer meetings, met local Muslim leaders, and tried to win their confidence. Mistrust between Hindus and Muslims continued to exist, and stray incidents of violence occurred even during his stay in Noakhali. On the evening of 10 November, two persons were reported to have been murdered while returning home after attending Gandhi's evening prayer at Duttapara relief camp.

Gandhi's stay in Noakhali was resented by the Muslim leadership. On 12 February 1947, while addressing a rally at Comilla, A. K. Fazlul Huq said that Gandhi's presence in Noakhali had harmed Islam enormously. His presence had created a bitterness between the Hindus and the Muslims. The resentment against Gandhi's stay in Noakhali grew day by day. Towards the end of February 1947, it became vulgar. Gandhi's route was deliberately dirtied every day and Muslims began to boycott his meetings.

Gandhi discontinued his mission halfway and started for Bihar on 2 March 1947 at the request of the Muslim League leaders of Bengal. On 7 April, more than a month after leaving Noakhali, Gandhi received telegrams from Congress Party workers in Noakhali, describing attempts to burn Hindus alive. He responded that the situation in Noakhali required that the Hindus should either leave or perish.

Refugees 
The survivors fled Noakhali and Tippera in two distinct phases. The first batches of refugees arrived in Kolkata after the massacres and forced conversions. The refugee flow subsided when the Government announced relief measures and the relief organisations started working in Noakhali and Tippera. However, in March 1947, when the Congress agreed to the Partition of India, the relief camps were abandoned and a fresh refugee influx took place in Tripura, Assam and the region that was to become West Bengal. Around 50,000 Hindu refugees who were sheltered in temporary relief camps were subsequently relocated to Guwahati in Assam.

Aftermath 
According to historian Rakesh Batabyal, the situation never returned to normal. Sporadic incidents of violence continued and even the police were not spared. In one incident in early November, reported by Frederick Burrows to Frederick Pethick-Lawrence, a senior ICS officer and his police party were attacked three times while escorting Hindu survivors to a refugee camp. The police had to open fire; seven people were killed and ten wounded. The Bengali periodical Desher Vani published in Noakhali quoted a relief worker in the Ramganj police station area who stated that even after four months people had not returned to their houses.

Investigation and cover-up 
On 29 September 1946, the Government of Bengal passed an ordinance prohibiting the press from publishing information regarding any communal disturbances. Any statement, advertisement, notice, news or opinion piece was prohibited from mentioning: the name of the place where the incident occurred; the way in which the victims were killed or injured; the name of the community to which the victim or the perpetrator belonged; and the destruction or desecration of places of worship or shrines, if any. According to Ramesh Chandra Majumdar, the promulgation of the ordinance was the main reason that news of the incidents was not published in the press for a week.

The Government of Bengal appointed Edward Skinner Simpson, a retired judge, to investigate the incidents in Noakhali. His report was covered up by the government. After arriving at Kolkata, on his way to Noakhali, Gandhi sought a copy of the report from Prime Minister Suhrawardy. The latter had initially agreed to provide him with a copy. However, the Governor and the secretaries strongly objected to such a proposition and Suhrawardy declined to hand over the report to Gandhi. A copy of the report was with Mathur, the secretary to Suhrawardy, who secretly provided a summary to The Statesman. The editor published a censored version on 13 November 1946. In the report, Simpson mentioned that for a proper investigation into the happenings in Noakhali, at least 50 senior officers would need to be engaged for a period of six months.

Noakhali on the eve of Partition 
Though the massacres and mass conversions had stopped in October, persecution of the Hindu population continued in Noakhali, even during Gandhi's stay there. A week after Gandhi's departure from Noakhali, A. V. Thakkar wrote from Chandpur on 9 March before leaving for Mumbai that lawlessness was still persisting in Noakhali and Tipperah. Even five months after the riots in October, there was no sign of its stopping. On the contrary the withdrawal of some of the temporary police stations was encouraging the criminal elements. On 19 March 1947, the Muslims held secret meetings in various places. They threatened the Hindus with mass slaughter. Ghulam Sarwar convened a huge meeting at Sonapur under the Ramganj police station on 23 March. The day was to be celebrated as Pakistan Day, and the day's programme was a general strike. Thousands of Muslims would gather at the meeting, which had been announced in the village markets on 20 March by the beating of the drums. At the announcement of the meeting, the Hindus began to flee, fearing further oppression. The Choumohani railway station became packed with Hindu refugees. The relief workers of the Gandhi peace mission requested the District Superintendent of Police, the Additional District Magistrate and Abdul Gofran, a minister, not to allow the meeting to be held. The DSP, however, stated that the meeting would be held and the police would adopt adequate security measures. The relief workers reported the matter to Mahatma Gandhi and Suhrawardy and the latter wired a government order to the Noakhali SP on 22 March prohibiting meetings in public places, processions and slogans. However, meetings could be held in private places like madrasas and mosques. Rehan Ali, the Officer-in-Charge of the Ramganj police station, said that the meeting would be held at the Amtali ground, which was a private place as it was adjacent to a mosque, and therefore the government order would not be violated. The Muslim League leadership resolved to hold the meeting at any cost. Muslim League leaders Mohammad Ershad and Mujibur Rahman enlisted minister Abdul Gofran as one of the speakers at the meeting. On 23 March 4,000 to 5,000 Muslims marched in a procession from Ramganj to Kazirkhil and then back to Ramganj, chanting slogans, and gathered for the meeting. Addressing the gathering one of the speakers, Yunus Mian Pandit, criticised the Hindus for the practice of untouchability and lack of a purdah system and justified an economic boycott on them.

On 13 May 1947, William Barret, the Divisional Commissioner of the Chittagong Division, submitted a top secret report to P. D. Martyn, the Additional Secretary to the Department of Home, Government of Bengal detailing the persecution of the Hindus. He reported that groups of Muslims sometimes searched Hindus and took belongings which caught their fancy. In some cases the Hindus had their daily shopping snatched away. Coconuts and betel nuts were forcefully taken from Hindu homesteads. Cattle were stolen. Corrugated iron sheets and timber were taken. Paddy plants were uprooted from Hindu-owned land. Efforts were made to close down Hindu-owned cinemas. Demands were made that the Muslims should have 50% of the loom licenses, even though the vast majority of weavers were Hindus belonging to the Yogi caste. Efforts were made to rid the marketplaces of Hindu merchants and shopkeepers. Hindus who had rebuilt their houses were told to leave the district. Hindu complainants at the police station were threatened by Muslims and compelled to agree to their cases being compromised. It was reported on 13 May that a Hindu woman of Dharmapur village had been rescued while being abducted by Muslims. On 16 May abduction was unsuccessfully attempted on two Hindu women.

Repercussions in Bihar and United Provinces 

As a reaction to the Noakhali riots, riots rocked Bihar towards the end of 1946. Severe violence broke out in Chhapra and Saran district between 25 and 28 October. Between 30 October and 7 November, mass communal massacres in Bihar brought Partition closer to inevitability. Very soon Patna, Munger and Bhagalpur also became the sites of serious turbulence. Begun as a reprisal for the Noakhali riot, this rioting was difficult for authorities to deal with because it was spread out over a large area of scattered villages, and the number of casualties was impossible to establish accurately: "According to a subsequent statement in the British Parliament, the death-toll amounted to 5,000. The Statesmans estimate was between 7,500 and 10,000; the Congress party admitted to 2,000; Mr. Jinnah [the head of the Muslim League] claimed about 300." However, by 3 November, the official estimate put the number of deaths at only 445. Writing in 1950, Francis Tuker, who at the time of the violence was General Officer Commanding-in-Chief, Eastern Command, India, put the Muslim death toll between 7,000 and 8,000.

Severe rioting also took place in Garhmukteshwar in United Provinces, where a massacre occurred in November 1946 in which "Hindu pilgrims, at the annual religious fair, set upon and exterminated Muslims, not only on the festival grounds but in the adjacent town" while the police did little or nothing; the deaths were estimated at between 1,000 and 2,000.

Noakhali demography  
After the separation of undivided  Noakhali into Noakhali district, Feni district and Lakshmipur district, it has a population of 2,640,227 people as per 2011 census.

See also 
 Anti-Hinduism
 Persecution of Hindus#Bangladesh
 Hinduism in Bangladesh

Footnotes

References 

Mass murder in 1946
Partition of India
1946 in British India
1946 riots
20th-century mass murder in India
Anti-Hindu sentiment
Attacks on religious buildings and structures in India
Religiously motivated violence in India
Religious riots
Sexual violence at riots and crowd disturbances
Ethnic conflict
Ethnic cleansing
Ethnic cleansing in Asia
Bengal Presidency
Massacres of Bengali Hindus in British India
Massacres in British India
Massacres in 1946
Muslim League
Pogroms
Persecution of Hindus
Persecution by Muslims
1940s in British India
1940s in Pakistan
Anti-Hindu violence in British India
1946 murders in India
October 1946 events in Asia
November 1946 events in Asia
History of Noakhali